{{DISPLAYTITLE:Zeta2 Antliae}}

Zeta2 Antliae is the Bayer designation for a star in the southern constellation of Antlia, the air pump. With an apparent visual magnitude of 5.91, it is a relatively faint star that requires dark suburban skies for viewing with the naked eye.

The spectrum of this star matches a stellar classification of A9 IV, where the luminosity class of IV indicate that this is a subgiant star that is evolving away from the main sequence as the supply of hydrogen at its core is becoming exhausted. This is catalogued as an Am star, which means it is a chemically peculiar star that shows strong indications of certain trace metals in its spectrum. The chemical peculiarity is now considered doubtful.

References

External links
 Image Zeta2 Antliae

082513
Antliae, Zeta2
Antlia
A-type subgiants
046734
3789
Durchmusterung objects